Solla is a village in Togo. "Solla" may also refer to:
De Solla, a surname
Sara Solla, Argentine-American physicist
Solla Stirða, the Icelandic name of fictional character Stephanie in children's TV show LazyTown
Soraya Santiago Solla (1947–2020), Puerto Rican transgender pioneer